"Falling and Laughing" is the debut single by Scottish post-punk band Orange Juice. It was the first single released by the independent rock label Postcard Records. "Falling and Laughing" marked a new shift of the post-punk sound in general by using themes that were not normally used in the genre, such as love and innocence. It also had a brighter sound, contrasting with the music that their contemporaries, (including Joy Division and Echo & the Bunnymen), were making at the time, while still maintaining its roots in the experimentalism of the genre.

A re-recording of the song appears on the band's 1982 debut album You Can't Hide Your Love Forever.

The first 963 copies came with a free flexi-disc, containing an early version of Felicity: a song written by James Kirk and later covered by the Wedding Present.

Track listing
 "Falling and Laughing" - (4:00)
 "Moscow" - (2:01)
 "Moscow Olympics" - (2:07)

References

1980 debut singles
Orange Juice (band) songs
Songs written by Edwyn Collins
1980 songs